André Wallenborn (born 25 March 1995) is a German footballer who plays as a left-back for Eintracht Norderstedt.

References

External links
 
 

1995 births
Living people
Footballers from Cologne
German footballers
Association football defenders
1. FC Köln II players
Hallescher FC players
FC Viktoria Köln players
SC Wiedenbrück 2000 players
Alemannia Aachen players
Altonaer FC von 1893 players
FC Eintracht Norderstedt 03 players
3. Liga players
Regionalliga players